Vijay and I is a comedy film directed by Sam Garbarski and starring Moritz Bleibtreu and Patricia Arquette.

Cast
Moritz Bleibtreu as Will
Patricia Arquette as Julia
Danny Pudi as Rad
Catherine Missal as Lily
Michael Imperioli as Micky

References

External links
 
 

German comedy films
Belgian comedy films
2013 comedy films
2013 films
English-language German films
English-language Belgian films
2010s English-language films
2010s German films